The Ford Squire is a car that was produced by Ford UK from 1955 to 1959.

It was a two-door, four-seat estate design, related to the Ford Prefect 100E four-door saloon, sharing the same  Ford sidevalve  engine and other parts and the same interior trim. It was substantially shorter than both the Prefect and the closely related Ford Anglia 100E two-door saloon. It used the short front doors of the four-door model because the bodyshell was optimized for use as a panel van (which was marketed as the Thames 300E). The rear door was in two pieces split horizontally. The rear seat could be folded flat to convert from a four-seater to a load carrier. Until 1957 there were wood trim pieces screwed to the sides of the vehicle.

The Squire competed in the same market segment as the Hillman Husky and Austin A30 / A35 based estate, both significantly more popular in the UK than longer estates at the time. Total production was 17,812 cars.

The test car (with the optional heater) cost £668, including taxes.

Ford Escort
The Ford Escort was a mechanically identical estate car with the lower trim level of the Ford Anglia. This proved more popular, and a total of 33,131 Escorts were produced between 1955 and 1961. Production of the Escort continued until 1961, two years longer than the Squire. 

The Escort name was later used by Ford of Europe in 1968 on another small car, and a North American variant was introduced in 1980.

References

Squire
Cars introduced in 1955
1960s cars
Station wagons
Rear-wheel-drive vehicles